Chester Adams (born February 6, 1985) is a former American football guard. He was drafted by the Bears in the seventh round of the 2008 NFL Draft. He played college football at Georgia.

Early years
Chester played high school football at Luverne High School in Luverne, Alabama under former University of Alabama head coach Mike Dubose.

External links
Chicago Bears bio
Georgia Bulldogs bio

1985 births
Living people
People from Luverne, Alabama
American football offensive tackles
American football offensive guards
Georgia Bulldogs football players
Chicago Bears players